Falco van den Aker, professionally known as Deepend is a Dutch DJ/producer. He gained international recognition after his remix of Matt Simons' "Catch & Release" peaked at number one in five countries and the European Airplay charts. The DJ racked in over 250 million Spotify plays and 80 million YouTube streams for the remix. Deepend was originally a duo consisting of van den Aker and fellow Dutch producer Bob van Ratingen; van Ratingen left in 2018 and van den Aker now uses the Deepend name as a solo project.

Career 
Deepend's remix of Matt Simons' "Catch & Release" song has become the second most played song on Dutch radio in 2016.

They released a collaboration via Spinnin' Records with Sam Feldt titled "Runaways" which featured vocals from Teemu. A remix pack for the song was later released featuring remixes from Jay Hardway, M-22, Muzzaik & Stadiumx, eSquire, Jonathan Pitch, Afreaux and Wild Culture.

Discography

Singles

Remixes

References 

Living people
Musicians from Amsterdam
Dutch DJs
Deep house musicians
Electronic musicians
Electronic music duos
Spinnin' Records artists
Armada Music artists
Ultra Records artists
Electronic dance music DJs
Year of birth missing (living people)